Complete Studio Box Set is an anthology box set by American post-punk band Savage Republic, released in 2002 by Mobilization Records.

Track listing

Release history

References

External links 
 Complete Studio Box Set at Discogs (list of releases)

2002 compilation albums
Savage Republic albums